Mount Lugano is a mountain in eastern Greenland. Administratively it is part of the Northeast Greenland National Park.

History
This peak was named Monte Lugano, after the town of Lugano in Switzerland, by Swiss geologist Eugen Wegmann (1896 - 1982) at the time of Lauge Koch's 1931-34 Three-year Expedition to East Greenland. Louise Boyd had previously used the temporary names "Scoop Mountain" and "C. Mountain" in her 1931 Greenland expedition. 

Mount Lugano was first climbed by Eugen Wegmann, together with fellow Swiss geologist Augusto Gansser (1910 – 2012), on 11 August 1934. According to an interview he gave in 1939 to the magazine Illustrazione Ticinese, Wegmann allegedly was overcome by nostalgia for pleasant Lugano, standing hungry and thirsty in the harsh polar weather at the summit of the mountain. Hence the name.

Geography
Mount Lugano is the highest point of Gletscherland.
The summit of Mount Lugano has a concave shape topped by an ice cap that is apparent when viewed from Bocksrietdal in the west, across the Hisinger Glacier.

See also
List of mountains in Greenland

References

External links
Greenland Pilot - Danish Geodata Agency

Lugano